Camp Mataponi (formerly known as Highland Nature Camps) is an all-girls sleepaway camp in Naples, Maine, United States for girls approximately 7 to 15 years old.  The camp is situated on Sebago Lake and accounts for over 5,000 feet of lakefront property. Camp Mataponi has grown to accommodate about 500 campers. Originally, the camp was called Highland Nature Camps. In the 1940s, it was renamed to Camp Mataponi. 

It was founded in 1910 by Eugene Lehman, his wife Madeleine Davidsburg Lehman, and Estelle B. Davidsburg as Highland Nature Camps. Mostly visited by distinguished Jewish families and from people from New York City, it was a nonsectarian all-girls summer camp. In 1926, the camp had rifle shooting as an activity. In 1935, the camp ran between mid-June and September. To allow campers to both do sports and learn scholarly subjects, the affiliated Highland Manor School ran classes.

The current directors of the camp are Marcy and Dan Isdaner.

Some activities at Camp Mataponi include: water sports, high ropes, baseball, archery, boating, and water trampoline.  Business Insider in 2012 included Camp Mataponi on an "Absurdly Expensive Summer Camps" list, noting that students had to pay $10,400. Business Insider said the camp's lunch salad bar has 30 choices and it hosted themed barbequeues every week with names like "Under the Sea", "Funky Princess Super Hero", and "Western night".

References

External links
 Official website

Organizations established in 1910
Mataponi
Buildings and structures in Cumberland County, Maine
Naples, Maine